Der Club an der Alster is a field hockey and tennis club located in Hamburg, Germany.

The men's team have won seven Bundesliga titles, with the most recent one being won in the 2010–11 season. The women's team won their first Bundesliga title in the 2017–18 season.

Honours

Men
Bundesliga
 Winners (7): 1998–99, 2000–01, 2002–03, 2003–04, 2006–07, 2007–08, 2010–11
 Runners-up (3): 1999–2000, 2001–02, 2004–05
EuroHockey Club Champions Cup
 Winners (2): 2000, 2002
 Runners-up (1): 2008
EuroHockey Cup Winners Cup
 Runners-up (1): 2003
Indoor Bundesliga
 Winners (3): 2003–04, 2010–11, 2018–19
 Runners-up (4): 1987–88, 1995–96, 2017–18, 2022–23
EuroHockey Indoor Club Cup
 Winners (3): 2005, 2012, 2020

Women
Bundesliga
 Winners (2): 2017–18, 2018–19
 Runners-up (3): 2001–02, 2005–06, 2008–09
Indoor Bundesliga
 Winners (5): 2005–06, 2007–08, 2008–09, 2017–18, 2019–20
 Runners-up (6): 2004–05, 2011–12, 2012–13, 2014–15, 2018–19, 2022–23
EuroHockey Indoor Club Cup
 Winners (3): 2007, 2009, 2010

Current squad

Men's squad

Women's squad

References

External links
Official website

 
Field hockey clubs in Germany
Field hockey clubs established in 1919
Sport in Hamburg
1919 establishments in Germany